LeToya Nicole Luckett (born March 11, 1981) is an American R&B singer and actress. She rose to fame in the late 1990s as a founding member of the R&B girl group Destiny's Child, one of the world's best-selling girl groups of all time. As a member of Destiny's Child, she achieved four US Top 10 hit singles, "No, No, No", "Bills, Bills, Bills", "Say My Name" and "Jumpin', Jumpin'", and won two Grammy Awards. In the 2000s, she began her solo career after leaving the group and signing a record deal with Capitol Records. Her solo debut album, LeToya (2006), debuted at number-one on the U.S. Billboard 200 chart, and was certified platinum by the RIAA, that same year.

The lead single, "Torn", reached the Top 40 in the U.S., and set records on BET's top ten countdown show 106 & Park. Luckett was awarded Top Songwriter at the 2006 ASCAP Rhythm and Soul Awards, and was nominated for Outstanding New Artist at the 2007 NAACP Image Awards. Luckett released a second solo album, Lady Love (2009), which debuted at number-one on the U.S. Top R&B/Hip-Hop Albums chart.

Luckett has since become an actress. She landed a leading role in the movie Preacher's Kid. She was part of the cast of the feature films Killers and From the Rough, as well as starring on the second season of the HBO TV series Treme, and on the third season of the VH1 TV series Single Ladies. She also had a recurring role in the OWN series Greenleaf.

Luckett returned to music in 2017, releasing her third studio album, Back 2 Life (2017), her first independent release, which peaked at number-four on the U.S. Independent albums chart. The album was preceded by two singles—"Back 2 Life" and "Used To". Luckett has sold over 25 million records with Destiny's Child on the group's first two albums and singles.

Early life and music career

Early life and career 
Luckett was born on March 11, 1981, in Houston, Texas. She is the older of two children, with a younger brother named Gavin. She grew up singing in her local Brentwood Baptist Church. She also took vocal lessons to become an opera singer. Her father, who was also a singer, was very proud of his daughter's vocal talents and tried to get her in the music business. Luckett was given the chance to sing her first solo at the age of five. "The lady just gave me the mic one Sunday and I sang," she recalled. Shortly thereafter, she joined the children's choir and began performing in plays at her elementary school. One day, she walked to her desk in class to find a girl sitting there. Luckett asked her teacher to remove the girl, Beyoncé Knowles, from her assigned seat. They later became friends and Luckett was invited to join Beyoncé's singing group Girl's Tyme, which later became Destiny's Child.

1993–2000: Destiny's Child and departure 

In 1993, Luckett joined Beyoncé Knowles, LaTavia Roberson, and Kelly Rowland to complete the Houston-based R&B group, Destiny's Child. The roles of the group consisted with Knowles as lead vocalist, Rowland as second-lead vocalist alongside Roberson and Luckett as background vocalists with Roberson as alto (and spokesperson) adding the low notes and Luckett as the soprano adding the high notes to the group's harmony, with occasional leads too. After being signed and later dropped by Elektra Records in 1995, the group began working with D'wayne Wiggins and eventually signed with Columbia Records in 1997, but not before signing with group manager Mathew Knowles, Beyoncé's father. According to the E! Television Special, Boulevard of Broken Dreams, Mathew forced the girls to sign management agreements with him before they could sign with the label. Luckett's mother requested the contracts be reviewed by an attorney, but Mathew denied this request. However, Luckett eventually signed with him and joined the group. After graduating from the Houston club scene, the group opened for established acts such as Dru Hill, SWV, and Immature, was included on the Men in Black movie soundtrack, and released their 1998 self-titled debut album Destiny's Child. The album spawned two singles: the platinum "No, No, No Part II" (featuring Wyclef Jean) and "With Me". Subsequently, the group made it on the soundtrack album of the romantic drama Why Do Fools Fall in Love with the song "Get on the Bus" (featuring Timbaland), and later toured as an opening act on TLC's "Fanmail Tour".

In 1999, the group released their second album, The Writing's on the Wall. The album became one of the biggest selling albums released by a female group, and was certified eight times platinum in the USA. As opposed to the first album, Luckett had more contribution to the second album in terms of co-writing. The album spawned four hit singles: "Bills, Bills, Bills", "Bug a Boo", "Say My Name", and "Jumpin' Jumpin'". The two singles "Bills, Bills, Bills" and "Say My Name" were also nominated for Grammy awards, which "Say My Name" won in two different categories. The album had also been released in a "Houston Special Edition" which included a bonus track, where Luckett sung lead along with the other members, titled "Can't Help Myself".

In late 1999, in the midst of the group's success and rise, Luckett and Roberson asserted that they wanted their own manager because of the increasing lack of communication with manager Mathew Knowles. The pair said they never wanted to fire Knowles, but wanted to secure outside management to represent them. Soon after, Luckett and Roberson found themselves ostracized by the Knowles family and the group's management. When the music video for "Say My Name" debuted in February 2000, they were replaced by two new members, Michelle Williams and Farrah Franklin. Luckett and Roberson filed a lawsuit against Mathew, Beyoncé, and Kelly, charging them with breach of partnership and fiduciary duties, and sought unspecified damages. Luckett and Roberson withdrew the case against Beyoncé and Kelly, but continued to sue Mathew. The case was eventually settled, with Luckett and Roberson receiving royalties for their contributions as founding members of the group. Shortly following the release of Destiny's Child's Survivor, Luckett and Roberson filed another lawsuit against the group in March 2002. They claimed that the album's lead single, "Survivor", violated their previous settlement due to its lyrics. The case was again settled out of court.

2001–2008: Solo debut, LeToya 
After several months of media speculation, it was announced via the MTV News website that Luckett and Roberson had created a new group called Anjel. After several auditions, Naty Quinones and Tiffany Beaudoin were selected as members. The group recorded a 22-song demo in Atlanta, Georgia, with the help of R&B group Jagged Edge. The group also appeared in Jagged Edge's video for "Where the Party At (Remix)". However, the production company (581 Entertainment) which handled the group collapsed and all the members of Anjel went on to pursue solo projects. The recorded tracks were later leaked onto the Internet.

After the Anjel project fell through, Luckett joined with Noontime, an Atlanta-based management/production company. Along with Noontime, she recorded a five-song demo and eventually signed with Capitol Records in 2003. Soon after, she began working on her debut solo album. The first promotional song, "You Got What I Need", was released in 2004, followed next year by "All Eyes on Me". She was featured on "My Promise" with her label mate Houston on his debut album It's Already Written, "What Love Can Do" on the Coach Carter soundtrack, and on "This Is My Life" with former boyfriend and rapper Slim Thug on his album Already Platinum. LeToya's self-titled debut album was released in July 2006 and debuted at number one on the U.S. Billboard 200 and Top R&B/Hip-Hop Albums charts. LeToya was certified gold after one month and by December 2006, the album had been certified platinum. Luckett and Beyoncé Knowles are the only members of Destiny's Child to have an album debut at number one on the Billboard 200 and achieve platinum status in the U.S.

The album is a hip-hop inspired R&B production. Producers included Jermaine Dupri, Scott Storch, Teddy Bishop, B. Cox, and musical guests Slim Thug, Mike Jones, Paul Wall, and Bun B. "All Eyes on Me" was originally chosen as Luckett's debut single, but  "Torn" was ultimately selected instead. The ballad (produced by Teddy Bishop) was released in March 2006 and became an R&B hit. The song climbed the Billboard charts, peaking at number two on the Hot R&B/Hip-Hop Songs.

Although Torn was still receiving airplay, her second single, "She Don't" was released to radio, and the video premiered on BET's Access Granted in July 2006, featuring Slim Thug. The single received moderate success, reaching number 17 on the Hot R&B/Hip-Hop chart. In November 2006, "Obvious" was selected as the third single. According to Billboard, the song had a 94% chance of becoming a hit, but due to the merger of Capitol Records and Virgin Records, all promotional money was frozen, therefore the single was never officially released. Luckett was also named "One of the Best New Artists of 2006" by AOL Music, number two on Rap-Up magazines' "Top 5 Breakthrough Artists of 2006," and received multiple nominations from the NAACP, the Soul Train Music Awards, and the Teen Choice Awards. BET promoted Luckett on 106 & Park, The Center, The Black Carpet, and with a three-part reality series special called The H-Town Chick which aired from May to July 2006. The series chronicled Luckett's experiences during her summer promotional tour and insight about her life since Destiny's Child. BET also hosted a contest that gave fans the opportunity to decide the final outcome of the "Torn" video. Cingular hosted a lip-sync contest that awarded those who best performed "Torn" in an online submitted video. In addition to a nationwide radio tour, club performances, a brief European and Asian appearances, Luckett participated in the 2006 "Pantene Total You" Tour, the "Cingular Live in Concert" series, and was invited by Mary J. Blige to join her summer tour, The Breakthrough Experience Tour, as her opening act.

In July 2006, while opening for a Mary J. Blige concert, Luckett announced that her upcoming album was going to be named Lady Love, she then introduced and performed two new songs "Lady Love" and "Don't Let Me Get Away". On December 10, 2007, a buzz track, Swagger, that features rappers such as Slim Thug, Killa Kyleon and Bun B leaked onto the Internet. In 2008, Luckett was featured on Webbie's single "I Miss You" which was a moderate success.

2009–2013: Lady Love 

Luckett's second solo album was released on August 25, 2009. Production for Lady Love originally began in 2007, with a release scheduled several times in 2008. This was postponed due to lack of funding related to the Capitol Records and Virgin Records merger that had earlier affected the release of her third single "Obvious". In early 2009, the release date for Lady Love was announced to be May 19, 2009, then pushed to June 16, and finally set to August 25, 2009. Amidst much anticipation for the album release, Luckett released a five-track sampler on May 19, 2009. The sampler features first single "Not Anymore" and 1 minute 30-second snippets of "Regret", "She Ain't Got...", "Lady Love" and "Matter". The album was released to CD and music download on August 25, 2009, in the US and worldwide a day earlier. An explicit version of the album (bearing a Parental Advisory label) was also made available. To celebrate the album's release, LeToya hosted an album-release party at Cain in New York City on August 27, 2009.
"Not Anymore", the lead single, was produced by Bei Maejor and co-produced and written by Ne-Yo. Released in February 2009, it became the most added song at urban radio, debuting at number ninety-eight on the US Billboard Hot R&B/Hip-Hop Songs chart before peaking at number eighteen and just missing the US Billboard Hot 100 singles chart, peaking at number 107. A music video for the single was shot on February 13, 2009. Directed by Bryan Barber, the music video is set in the 1960s and is split into 3 sections/time periods – 1961, 1964 and 1968. The sets, costumes and props change accordingly in each section to show the trends, fashions and styles of those particular years.

The video was released on March 10, 2009, and peaked at number three on the 106 & Park video countdown.
"She Ain't Got..." the album's second single, was produced by Cory Bold and written by LeToya, Andre Merritt, Chris Brown and Bold. Chosen by fans, it became the first LeToya single to carry a Parental Advisory label, though a "clean" version was also released. It became the most added song on rhythmic radio, peaking at number thirty-nine on the Billboard Rhythmic Top 40 chart, while peaking at number seventy-five on the Billboard Pop 100 Airplay chart and number twenty on the Billboard Hot Dance Club Play. However, the single was most successful in Japan where it peaked at number forty-nine on the Japan Hot 100. A music video, directed by Bryan Barber was shot on June 3, 2009, and premiered on Yahoo Music on June 30, 2009, featuring guest star Major League Baseball players Orlando Hudson and Matt Kemp of the Los Angeles Dodgers as well as Baseball Hall of Fame member Dave Winfield.
"Regret", featuring rapper Ludacris, was produced by Tank and Jerry "Texx" Franklin and written by Tank, LeToya, Franklin, K. Stephens, J. Valentine, R. Newt and C. Bridges. Released as the third single – based only on downloads and airplay – "Regret" peaked at number eight on the US Billboard Hot R&B/Hip-Hop Songs chart and debuted at number one-hundred on the Billboard Hot 100, making it LeToya's first single since her debut; "Torn", to enter the US Hot 100, peaking at number seventy-eight. It also peaked at number forty-two on the Billboard Radio Songs chart and was listed at number six on AOL Music's "Top R&B Songs of 2009" list. The music video for "Regret" was premiered on BET's 106 & Park on November 11, 2009, before being ranked at number twenty-three on BET: Notarized: Top 100 Videos of 2009 countdown.
"Good To Me", produced by Tank and Jerry "Texx" Franklin and written by Tank, Franklin, K. Stephens, R. Newt and J. Valentine, was released as the album's fourth and final single. Though the song failed to chart, a music video directed by makeup artist AJ Crimson and co-starring model-actor Keston Karter was released on February 11, 2010.

2014–present: Back 2 Life and upcoming fourth studio album 

In January 2014, Luckett announced the title of her third studio album Until Then on The Wendy Williams Show, with a planned 2016 release.

On February 11, 2014, Luckett released the first promo single Don't Make Me Wait
from "Until Then". A remix featuring rapper T.I. was released on March 10, 2015. On January 5, 2015, Luckett released a track "I'm Ready" on her YouTube channel. On January 16, 2015, Luckett released "Together" inspired to end illegal gun violence in America in recent partnership with the Caliber Foundation.

On December 7, 2016, she released the single Back 2 Life, with an accompanying music video released on January 10, 2017.

On April 10, 2017, Luckett posted on her Twitter page that her third studio album would be released on May 12, 2017, with the album title changing from "Until Then" to "Back 2 Life".
On April 17, 2017, Used To, a second single from the album, was released.

Acting career 
Luckett's first role on television was on the WB show Smart Guy in 1998 with Destiny's Child. She also had an appearance in the 1999 movie Beverly Hood. She has been a student at Tasha Smith's acting workshop. Since 2008, Luckett has been acting in plays, television and movies. She was cast in JD Lawrence's stage play Rumors, as the character Michelle. She hit the road from January 31, 2008, to March 2, 2008. Luckett was also the star of the movie Preacher's Kid, released in January 2010.

She appeared in the movie Killers, released on June 4, 2010, along with Ashton Kutcher, Katherine Heigl, Tom Selleck and Usher. Luckett then finished shooting the 2011 movie From the Rough, alongside Taraji P. Henson and Tom Felton. For the second season, Luckett was cast in the HBO drama series Treme. In 2013, Luckett landed a recurring role on the VH1 television series Single Ladies. In  2016, she was cast in the second season of Rosewood. In 2017, Luckett began playing a recurring role on the OWN TV series Greenleaf.

Webisodes 
LeToya has had two web series of herself on YouTube. In 2006, she did H-Town Chick; and in 2012, she did Life, Love & Music.

2006: H-Town Chick 
A three-episode series on YouTube featuring the singer explaining her role in Destiny's Child and discussing her first self-titled album LeToya.

2012: Life, Love and Music 
A six-episode series on YouTube giving an inside look at the singer's life and the recording process of her third album.

Personal life

Relationships 
In 2015, Luckett and motivational speaker Rob Hill Sr. reportedly got engaged, after a year of dating, and secretly wed in January 2016. It was later alleged by TMZ that the pair had called it quits, after only two months of marriage. In August 2017, LeToya announced her engagement to entrepreneur Tommicus Walker via Instagram. They were married in a lavish ceremony at Villa Antonia in Austin, Texas on December 10, 2017. In June 2018, the couple announced that they were expecting their first child together. In  October 2018, Luckett revealed on her Instagram that the two were expecting a baby girl. Their daughter was born on January 4, 2019.  In March 2020, the couple announced they were expecting a baby boy, their second child together. They welcomed their son on September 14, 2020. On January 11, 2021, the couple announced their divorce. Luckett confirmed that she and Walker were no longer married in July 2021.

Endorsements 
In 2010, Luckett became the new face of Luster's Hair Care replacing Karyn White. She appeared on the product line's boxes, billboards and commercials.

Lady Elle Boutique 
In 2003, Luckett became the owner of Lady Elle Boutique, an upscale women's boutique. She originally opened this clothing boutique in the Uptown Park shopping center in her hometown of Houston, Texas as Lady L Boutique but later renamed it to Lady Elle Boutique. In 2008, the singer opened the store's second location in The Galleria in Houston.

Philanthropy 
After the release of her first solo album, Luckett became involved in philanthropic activity. She has participated in various events like the "Women in Entertainment Empowerment Summit". She was also part of the national tour of the "Hip-Hop Summit Action Network 'Get Your Money Right' a Financial Empowerment Summit."

She visits schools to motivate and encourage children to study and to further their education after graduation. She also speaks on the subject of violence and domestic abuse.

Discography 

Studio albums
 LeToya (2006)
 Lady Love (2009)
 Back 2 Life (2017)

with Destiny's Child

 Destiny's Child (1998)
 The Writing's on the Wall (1999)

Filmography

Film

Television

References

External links 

 
 
 
 

 
1981 births
Living people
Actresses from Houston
African-American actresses
African-American choreographers
American choreographers
African-American Christians
African-American female dancers
American female dancers
Dancers from Texas
African-American dancers
African-American women singer-songwriters
African-American record producers
Record producers from Texas
American child singers
American dance musicians
American women pop singers
American film actresses
American hip hop singers
American musical theatre actresses
American philanthropists
American contemporary R&B singers
American soul musicians
Capitol Records artists
Columbia Records artists
American women record producers
Destiny's Child members
Grammy Award winners
Musicians from Houston
20th-century African-American women singers
21st-century African-American women singers
Singer-songwriters from Texas